Black and White is a 2002 Australian film directed by Craig Lahiff and starring Robert Carlyle, Charles Dance, Kerry Fox, David Ngoombujarra, and Colin Friels. Louis Nowra wrote the screenplay, and Helen Leake and Nik Powell produced the film. For his performance in the film, Ngoombujarra won an Australian Film Institute award in 2003 as Best Actor in a Supporting Role.

Plot 
Based on real events, Black and White tells the story of Max Stuart (Ngoombujarra), a young aboriginal man who was sentenced to death after being found guilty of the murder of a nine-year-old girl on what was considered questionable evidence.  It follows the fight by his lawyers David O'Sullivan (Carlyle) and Helen Devaney (Fox) to save Stuart from execution, as well as Crown Prosecutor, Roderic Chamberlain's (Dance) efforts to convict Stuart.  Rohan Rivett editor of an Adelaide paper, The News, and its publisher, Rupert Murdoch (Ben Mendelsohn) also feature as leading the public response in the campaign to save Stuart.

In the final scene of the film, Max Stuart appeared as himself as an older man, driving along a dirt highway near Alice Springs where he lived at the time, and saying: "Yeah, some people think I'm guilty and some people think I'm not. Some people think Elvis is still alive, but most of us think he's dead and gone."

Critical response

On Rotten Tomatoes Black and White has an approval rating of 43% based on reviews from 7 critics. Australian reviewers praised it as "the sort of film Australia should be making" and "another notch in the belt for the Australian film industry". On its theatrical release in the UK, reviewers called it "[a] gripping, well-crafted tale", and "a challenging film that dares to trust our intelligence". !-- "[a] watchable fictionalisation [that is] interestingly ambiguous where another sort of film might have been content with PC certainty". - review not found --> However Philip French, writing in The Observer, called it "heavy handed".

Awards
In 2003, David Ngoombujarra won the Australian Film Institute award for Best Actor in aSupporting Role for his role.

Festivals
 Sydney Film Festival 2002 (opening film)
 Toronto IFF 2002
 London IFF 2002
 Hawaii IFF 2002 Gala
 Pusan Korea IFF 2002
 London Australian Film Festival 2003
 Dublin FF 2003
 Taipei FF 2003
 Valenciennes FF France 2003 Competition
 Belfast FF 2003
 Taos FF USA 2003
 Singapore IFF 2003
 Karlovy Vary IFF 2003
 SXSW FF USA 2004
 Beijing Australian Film Festival 2004
 Guangzhou FF 2004
 Cancun FF 2004
 Australian Embassy Roadshow – multiple countries

See also
 Cinema of Australia

References

External links
 
 Black and White at Oz Movies
 Black and White at the National Film and Sound Archive

2002 films
2002 drama films
Australian drama films
2000s English-language films
Drama films based on actual events
Films set in South Australia
Films scored by Cezary Skubiszewski
Cultural depictions of Rupert Murdoch
Films about Aboriginal Australians